Saint Lucia, an island nation in the Caribbean islands, has a relatively large tourism industry. Due to the relatively small land area of the country, most of the governmental promotion is performed by the state-operated Saint Lucia Tourism Authority, led by Executive Chairperson Agnes.

Area and location 
Saint Lucia has an area of 239 square miles (619 sq. km.). It is located in the eastern Caribbean Sea, in the windward islands.
 Coordinates: 
 Population: 183,627 (2023 est.) / World Rank: 189
 Capital City: Castries, Castries District, in northern Saint Lucia
 Largest City: Castries, population 53,000 (2000 est.)

There are two international airports in Saint Lucia.

Currency 
Together with other states in the island chain, Saint Lucia is part of the Organisation of Eastern Caribbean States, whose Eastern Caribbean Central Bank is responsible for a currency union managing the Eastern Caribbean dollar (US$1 = EC$2.7).

Tourism industry

Saint Lucia is a popular tourism site due to its tropical weather and scenery and for its large number of beaches and resorts. The island dates back to British and French rule in the 18th century. It is also known for its unique cuisine, exciting sports and adventure activities. Saint Lucia is one of the Caribbean's most spa-oriented destinations.

Resorts

Ladera Resort 
Ladera Resort (Soufrière District) is located on a volcano ridgeline, 1,000 feet above sea level. The resort is located on the grounds on one of Soufrière's oldest cocoa plantations. Ladera resort has 37 rooms and suites. Each room contains a private heated plunge pool with a view of at least one of the Pitons. Local art can be found in the rooms and throughout the resort, including hand-carved woodworks.

Ladera Resort is home to the Dasheene restaurant led by Executive Chef Nigel Mitchel. The chef prepares "stylish interpretations" of traditional St. Lucian dishes, such as sweet potato and coconut soup, Caribbean lamb salad, roast conch with pickled vegetables, Cajun-Creole vegetable bakes, jerk poulet sausage, and plantain gratin with coconut rum sauce. The restaurant is split into three levels: The Bar, a lunch section (which allows children, for non-hotel guests) and a dinner section. There is also a wine cellar, where guests can book a chef for a private dinner.

The Spa at Ladera has three treatment rooms and an outdoor series of cascading hot tubs in the spa gardens.

Cap Maison Resort & Spa 
Cap Maison Resort & Spa (Gros Islet District) is a 50-villa resort said to resemble a Mediterranean cliffside hotel.   

The Oceanview Villa Suite with Pool & Roof Terrace has a master bedroom, a living and dining room, a kitchen and large private verandahs, as well as rooftop space which offers a private swimming pool. For a private meal, guests can have the resort prepare a barbecue dinner on their rooftop. There are two restaurants on the property led by Head Chef Craig Jones: The Cliff at Cap, which offers fine dining and a contemporary French Caribbean menu, and The Naked Fisherman, which serves more casual eats on the beach.  

Spa treatments, including body massages, facials and exfoliations, are available in two treatment rooms, as well as on the villa terraces, the pool, gazebo, and beach. 

Group and private yoga, Pilates and fitness classes are also available. There are also two wine tastings offered: A casual tutored tasting and a fine wine tasting. Cooking classes can also be booked.

Beaches 

Saint Lucia is known for beaches, some of which are covered in black volcanic sand. The island's temperature averages 80°F (27°C) all year. The island offers many water sports, including snorkeling, jet skiing, and parasailing.

The following are some of the most popular and well-known beaches in the island nation of Saint Lucia:
Anse Chastanet beach on Chastanet Bay in Soufrière District
Anse Cochon beach on Cochon Bay in Canaries District
Anse de Sables beach in Vieux Fort District
Anse Louvet beach in Dennery District
Anse Mamin on Anse Bay in Soufrière District
Choc Beach in Castries District

Grande Anse beach in Gros Islet District
Kiwanies Beach in Castries District
Laborie Bay in Laborie District
Marigot Bay in Castries District
Marisule Beach in Gros Islet District

Pigeon Island beach in Gros Islet District
La Pointe Beach in Choiseul District

Reduit Beach, Rodney Bay in Gros Islet District
La Toc Beach in Castries District
Vigie Beach, near the  George F. L. Charles Airport in Castries District
Yellow Sands Beach in Castries District

Culture 

The Caribbean islands have a distinct culture from music to food to art. The foods include exotic fruits and local meats and spices. Chefs on the island have many new flavors for tourists to try and experiment with. Music includes genres ranging from jazz to reggae. Musicians from around the world travel to the small island to attend and perform at festivals. The art encompasses everything from the craftsmanship of the furniture to the paintings and clay sculptures.

Weddings
A report published by American Express Travel in 2006 revealed that St. Lucia is the world's top destination for weddings. According to the report, St. Lucia beat famous destinations like Las Vegas  and the Maldives.

Safety 
St. Lucia, like many other Caribbean countries, has been experiencing an increase in serious crime over the past few years. There has been an increase in robberies, burglaries, harassment, and even incidents of violent crime against tourists. Some of these cases have been reported in the international media and as such, St. Lucia's destination image is at risk. In an attempt to control the crime problem, the government has implemented a number of measures, which includes tougher penalties for some crime. However, these measures have not had a great effect on the crime rate. This has caused a noticeable decline in the tourist industry on the island.

In an attempt to combat crime against tourists, the Minister of Tourism has adopted a number of measures. In collaboration with the Royal St. Lucia Police Force, they have commissioned a team of Special Constables, who have powers of arrest. These Constables were placed into two groups: the Rapid Response Team and the Rangers. The Rapid Response Team performs both foot and mobile patrol in the tourist and hotel areas both in the north and south of the island. The Rangers also referred to as Beach Rangers, are responsible for patrolling the beaches near the hotels all over the island. By doing so the hope is to assure safety to the visitors on the islands. They also assist the hotel security by patrolling the hotel area.

Additionally, the prominent tourist sites located in Soufriere, such as the Drive-in Volcano, The Rain Forest, The Diamond Falls, and The Piton Heritage Site have private security officers, who have been hired by the Ministry of Tourism. The Port police also provide security to the tourists from the time they leave the cruise vessel until they return to the port area. They also ensure that the tourist boats are secure while in the port. This is done in collaboration with the Marine Police who constantly patrol the seaport area while the tourist boats are in the harbor. Whenever tourist boats come to the island, police patrols are normally increased in the area in order to ensure that the tourists are secure while on the island.

The Ministry of Tourism, in collaboration with the Royal St. Lucia Police, has also created a system of police audit checks on hotels. This system allows the police to carry out regular checks on security at the hotels around the island. They also advise the hotels on what security changes should be made in order to safeguard tourists. Tourists are still advised to be aware of any suspicious behavior and report anything immediately.

Other attractions

Saint Lucia, located in the eastern Caribbean Sea between Martinique and Saint Vincent, is the second-largest of the Windward Islands. The interior of the volcanically formed island consists of mountains and hills and is surrounded by a coastal strip. The cone-like twin peaks of the Gros Piton and Petit Piton are Saint Lucia's outstanding natural features.  Although cruises and beaches are what draw most tourists to Saint Lucia, other attractions include:
The Pitons, two volcanic plugs rising more than 700 m directly from the sea that form part of a UNESCO World Heritage Site.
Sulphur Springs - Located in the Soufrière District, it is the world's only drive-in volcano.
St. Lucia Botanical Gardens - This botanical garden has a wide variety of plant species, and a sulfur waterfall.
Toraille Waterfall on the Ravine Toraille in Soufrière District,

Major cities

There are 10 districts (formerly called quarters) in Saint Lucia.  Each district has a city with the same name as the district that serves as the seat of the district government. Some of the cities that tourists are drawn to include:
Castries, Castries District, population:  20,000
Choisuel, Choiseul District, population: 346
Gros Islet and Pigeon Island, Gros Islet District, population: 2,362
Marigot Bay, Castries District, population: 799
Soufrière, Soufrière District, population: 2,918

See also

 :Category: Tourist attractions in Saint Lucia
 BodyHoliday Resort St. Lucia
 Cap Maison
 Districts of Saint Lucia
 Economy of Saint Lucia
 List of airports in Saint Lucia
 List of rivers of Saint Lucia
 List of cities in Saint Lucia
 Saint Lucian cuisine
 Visa policy of Saint Lucia

References

External links
 St. Lucia Tourism Board

 
Saint Lucia